Carson Cistulli (born December 23, 1979) is an American poet, essayist and baseball analyst for the Toronto Blue Jays. His works of poetry include Some Common Weaknesses Illustrated, Assorted Fictions, and A Century of Enthusiasm.

Biography

Early years

Carson Cistulli was born December 23, 1979, in Concord, New Hampshire, to Philip Cistulli Jr. and Holly Young. Cistulli passed his early childhood in a middle class Italian-American household until his parents' divorce in 1994. Cistulli attended boarding school at Milton Academy in Massachusetts.

Education
After graduating from Milton in 1998, he attended Columbia University where he studied under poet Kenneth Koch of the New York School of poetry. After his studies under Koch, he moved to Seattle to write. He would later receive a bachelor's degree in Classical Civilizations from the University of Montana in Missoula and a master's degree in Creative writing from the University of Massachusetts Amherst.

Panic attacks
In an essay about sports and aesthetics, "A Lengthy Meditation on Baseball and the Science of Happiness," Cistulli explained that part of his turn towards writing was a therapeutic response to anxiety attacks. Cistulli wrote that these attacks became so intense that he at times struggled to breathe: "During the fall of 2001, while living in Missoula, MT, I began experiencing some symptoms of generalized anxiety: occasional tightness or pain in the chest and limbs, invasive thoughts about death and illness [...] those symptoms persisted off and on into the next spring, at which time I developed a considerably less pleasant one (i.e., symptom): for long periods of time, and with no warning, I was unable to breathe involuntarily."

Poetry
Cistulli's work A Century of Enthusiasm begins "People of the world, allow me to introduce myself: my name is Carson Harrington Cistulli, ambassador to crunk in the Western Hemisphere." Carson plays with context and language often mixing the vernacular with the scholastic. References to pop-culture (like the above mention of crunk) and intertextuality with scholastic figures as varied as Ralph Waldo Emerson, Sean Casey or Emily Dickinson occur frequently in his work. Cistulli also plays with the notions of authorship, poetic inspiration, and recontextualization.

Lisa Baker writes that "In a day and age when we are quick to consume the rigid definitions of relationships fed to us by those who wield power, Cistulli tutors us in language's malleability; a new comparison, an unexpected verb in a familiar phrase can force an entirely new perspective—and perhaps one more
curious and more generous."

Essays and journalism

Cistulli's essays and journalism have appeared in The New York Times, SBNation, FanGraphs, ESPN, The Hardball Times, The New Enthusiast, RotoWire, The Huffington Post, The Classical and The Portland Sportsman. He won the FSWA 2011 basketball sports writer of the year award for his writing at Rotowire and was elected to the Baseball Writers' Association of America in 2012.

Sabermetrics
Cistulli has written that his interest in sabermetrics is to explore "that place where quantitative analysis and aesthetics meet" in practicing what he calls the art of sabermetrical research. Within sabermetrics he is the creator of NERD, SCOUT and historical GBz%. Cistulli has influenced many contemporary sports thinkers including Rob Neyer who, asked about the value of Cistulli's work within the sabermetric community, responded "there's value in just about everything that Cistulli does. He's got an original mind and we'll ignore him at our peril."

Radio hosting
Cistulli was previously the host of "Goal: The Soccer Show" (103.3 FM Northampton, MA) and "The Shuttlecoque Sporting Hour" (1450 AM Portland, OR.) He was formerly the host of FanGraphs Audio.

Blue Jays
On November 16, 2018, Cistulli announced that he had been hired by the Toronto Blue Jays of Major League Baseball, and left Fangraphs to work for the team.

It has been reported that he is working alongside Jon Lalonde, Nick Manno and Brent Urcheck to "curate running rankings of the players in each organization."

Personal
Cistulli and Kali Coles announced their engagement in May 2009 and married in August. They have one son, Jackie.

Works

 Englished by Diverse Hands (2003)
 Free Radicals: American Poets Before Their First Books (2004)
 Some Common Weaknesses Illustrated (2006)
 Assorted Fictions (2006)
 Origin, sixth series, Spring (2006)
 A Century of Enthusiasm (2007)
 The Prostituesdays Anthology (editor, 2008)
 Spirited Ejaculations of a New Enthusiast (2015)

References

External links

 NPR/WFCR Interview – Tina Antolini interviews Carson Cistulli
 Fangraphs Audio – Host
 Goal: The Soccer Show – Host
 The Long Hello: Some Notes on Luck 2009
 I am Trying to Break Your Eyes: A Lengthy Meditation on Baseball and the Science of Happiness 2009
 Sabermetric Blogging and the Oinoanda Inscription 2010
 TLDR: On Learning to Die 2011
 On the Spectacles 2012
 FSWA Profile: Carson Cistulli 2012 (by Michael Naclerio)
 Carson Cistulli of Notgraphs, Italian Extraction 2013 (by Cy Schorek)
 Young People Will Have White Hair 2013

1979 births
Living people
American male poets
Baseball statisticians
American radio personalities
University of Massachusetts Amherst MFA Program for Poets & Writers alumni
Milton Academy alumni
21st-century American poets
21st-century American male writers